Limerick Township may refer to:
Limerick Township, Ontario
Limerick Township, Montgomery County, Pennsylvania

Township name disambiguation pages